Mayar Badhon is a 1997 Bengali film directed by Swapan Saha and produced by Shree Venkatesh Films under the banner of Shree Venkatesh Films. The film narrates the story of a man who once learns that the girl he has so long believed to be his own daughter, is the daughter of someone else. The film stars Prosenjit Chatterjee and Srabanti Chatterjee in leading roles. It also stars Subhendu Chatterjee, Abhishek Chatterjee, Rabi Ghosh, Rituparna Sengupta, Satabdi Roy, Anuradha Roy and Soham Chakraborty in supporting roles. The film marks the big screen debut of Srabanti Chatterjee.  The music of the film has been composed by Debojyoti Mishra.

Plot
Sagar Mukherjee is a tea taster in profession. He lives beside the house of Shipra, his neighbour. Prasad Halder is the boss of Sagar's company and her also lives beside them. Sagar and Shipra fall in love and go for registry marriage without informing Shipra's parents. Prasad helps them. Shipra starts living with Sagar. Shipra's father does not accept this relationship. Shipra becomes pregnant. She has to be admitted in a hospital. There she meets with Krishna who is also pregnant. Shipra and Krishna give birth to girls on the same day, but suddenly fire catches in the hospital, and the girls are exchanged. Only the doctor and the nurse knows this. Shipra and Sagar's daughter Maya, Nirmal and Krishna's daughter Trishna grows up. One day Shipra dies due to cardiac failure. So, taking Maya, Sagar shifts to a tea-garden. There he meets Nirmal and Krishna with their son Kushal and daughter Trishna. One day it is revealed that Trishna has a heart problem. The nurse accidentally learns about the Krishna's present status in the city and her girl's problem. In a major operation Trishna dies. The nurse reveals the incident of exchange of the babies to Krishna. Krishna and Nirmal discovered Maya's origin, but Sagar does not want to handover Maya to them. By law, Nirmal and Krishna get the charge of Maya. But Maya does not want to live with them. Sagar breaks down. Kushal does not want to recognise Maya as his sister. Maya runs away with Kushal and unites with her father Sagar. Krishna and Nirmal accept it.

Cast 
 Prosenjit Chatterjee as Sagar Mukherjee
 Srabanti Chatterjee as Maya
 Abhishek Chatterjee as Nirmal
 Subhendu Chatterjee
 Rabi Ghosh as Prasad Halder
 Rituparna Sengupta as Shipra
 Satabdi Roy as Krishna
 Anuradha Roy
 Soham Chakraborty as Kushal

References

External links 
 

Bengali-language Indian films
1997 films
1990s Bengali-language films
Indian drama films